Events from the 1550s in Denmark.

Incumbents
 Monarch – Christian III (until 1 January 1559), Frederick II
 Steward of the Realm – Eske Bille (until 1552)

Events

1550
 The construction of Hesselagergård Manor is completed.
1554
 Otte Krumpen succeeds Erik Eriksen Banner as Marshal of the Realm.
1559
 20 August  The coronation of Frederick II of Denmark.

Births
1556
 24 August – Sophia Brahe, noble (died 1643)

Deaths
1551
 21 January – Stygge Krumpen, bishop (b. c. 1485)
1552
 9 February – Eske Bille, diplomat and statesman (b. c. 1480)
1554
 16 January – Christiern Pedersen, scholar and publisher (b. c. 1480)
1555
 Mads Hak, composer (date unknown)
 10 April – Ove Bille, bishop and royal chancellor
1556
 Gertrud Skomagers, alleged witch (date unknown)
 7 October – Frederick of Denmark, bishop and son of Frederick I of Denmark and Sophie of Pomerania (b. 1532)
1558
 4 January – Claus Bille, nobleman (b. c. 1490)
 19 September – Cornelis Altenau, Danish-German architect
1559
 1 January – Christian III, King of Denmark and Norway (b. 1503)
 25 January – Christian II, King of Denmark, Norway and Sweden, forced to abdicate in 1523 (b. 1481)
 3 August – Andreas von Barby, nobleman
 14 October – Jens Tillufssøn Bjelke, Danish-Norwegian nobleman (b. 1508)
 19 December – Jørgen Sadolin, Lutheran reformer (b. c. 1490)

References

 
Denmark
Years of the 16th century in Denmark